Selysina is a genus in the phylum Apicomplexa.

History

This genus was created by Duboscq in 1917.

Taxonomy

There are three species recognised in this genus.

References

Apicomplexa genera